The UEFA Futsal Euro 2022 is an international futsal tournament to be held in the Netherlands from January 19 to February 6, 2022. The 16 national teams involved in the tournament were required by UEFA to register a squad of 14 players, including two goalkeepers. Each team is allowed to replace a maximum of one outfield player if he is injured or ill severely enough to prevent his participation in the tournament. Each team is also allowed to temporarily replace a goalkeeper if there are fewer than two healthy goalkeepers.

This article lists the national futsal squads that take part in the tournament. The age listed for each player is as of January 19, 2022, the first day of the tournament.

Group A

Netherlands
Head coach: Maximiliaan Tjaden

Serbia
Head coach: Dejan Majes

Ukraine
Head coach: Oleksandr Kosenko

Portugal
Head coach: Jorge Braz

After the team's first group stage match, goalkeeper Bebé withdrew injured and was replaced by Edu on 22 January.

Group B

Kazakhstan
Head coach:  Paulo Ricardo Kakà

Italy
Head coach: Massimiliano Bellarte

Before the team's second group stage match Stefano Mammarella was replaced by Lorenzo Pietrangelo due to testing positive for coronavirus and Gabriel Motta was replaced by Julio De Oliveira due to an injury.

Slovenia
Head coach: Tomislav Horvat

After the team's first group stage match, Gašper Vrhovec withdrew injured and was replaced by Kristjan Čujec on 22 January.

Finland
Head coach:  Mico Martić

Group C

Russia
Head coach: Sergei Skorovich

Before the team's second group stage match, Éder Lima withdrew injured and was replaced by Andrei Afanasyev.

Poland
Head coach: Błażej Korczyński

Slovakia
Head coach: Marián Berky

Croatia
Head coach: Marinko Mavrović

After the team's second group stage match, Josip Suton withdrew injured and was replaced by Duje Kustura on 29 January.

Group D

Georgia
Head coach: Avtandil Asatiani

Spain
Head coach: Federico Vidal

Adolfo Fernández didn't take part in the games against Bosnia and Herzegovina and Azerbaijan due to being tested positive on COVID-19.

Before the team's third group stage match, Esteban Cejudo withdrew injured and was replaced by Francisco Solano on 27 January.

Azerbaijan
Head coach:  José Alesio da Silva

Bosnia and Herzegovina
Head coach: Ivo Krezo

Goalkeeper Andrijano Dujmović had to play on the team's first group stage match due to the suspension received by goalkeepers Darko Milanović and Stanislav Galić for their red cards in the last game of the UEFA Futsal Euro 2022 qualifying.

References

External links
 Official website

UEFA Futsal Championship squads
Squads